Express.js, or simply Express, is a back end web application framework for building RESTful APIs with Node.js, released as free and open-source software under the MIT License. It is designed for building web applications and APIs. It has been called the de facto standard server framework for Node.js.

The original author, TJ Holowaychuk, described it as a Sinatra-inspired server, meaning that it is relatively minimal with many features available as plugins. Express is the back-end component of popular development stacks like the MEAN, MERN or MEVN stack, together with the MongoDB database software and a JavaScript front-end framework or library.

History 
Express.js was founded by TJ Holowaychuk. The first release, according to Express.js's GitHub repository, was on 22 May 2010. Version 0.12

In June 2014, rights to manage the project were acquired by StrongLoop. StrongLoop was acquired by IBM in September 2015; in January 2016, IBM announced that it would place Express.js under the stewardship of the Node.js Foundation incubator.

Features 

 Robust routing
 Concentrate on high-performance
 HTTP helpers (redirection, caching, etc)

Popularity 
Express.js is used by Fox Sports, PayPal, Uber and IBM.

Example 
The following program will respond to HTTP GET requests with the text 'Hi, your request has been received', and listen to the port the program is running on; Port 2000, in this case.
// Import the Express library.
const express = require('express');

// Initializing the app.
const app = express();

// Getting the path request and sending the response with text
app.get('/', (req,res) => {
    res.send('Hi, your request has been received');
});

// Listen on port 2000
app.listen(2000, => {
    console.log('listening at http://localhost:2000');
});

See also 
 JavaScript framework
 Meteor
 Socket.IO

References

External links

JavaScript libraries
Web frameworks
IBM software